The Democratic Party, initially known as Our Party, was formed in May 1969 by Desmond Donnelly, who had been a Labour MP for Pembrokeshire, but had resigned the whip in January 1968 and been expelled by the party two months later.  His Constituency Labour Party supported him and was disaffiliated from the party along with Donnelly's expulsion.

The party had an anti-socialist agenda and supported UK intervention in the Vietnam War. In some respects, the party was to the right of the Conservatives, advocating the abolition of the welfare state, sweeping changes to the taxation system, and the return of national service. It fought two by-elections and five seats in the 1970 general election, but only Donnelly polled a significant number of votes.

The party wound up in April 1971 when Donnelly joined the Conservative Party, without even informing the Democratic Party's membership.

Election Results

Defunct political parties in the United Kingdom
Political parties established in 1969
1969 establishments in the United Kingdom
Political parties disestablished in 1971
1971 disestablishments in the United Kingdom